Glimpses/Impressions is a film by Jean-François Pouliot for the Canadian pavilion at Expo 2010 in Shanghai. The 5 minute 20 second-long film depicts 24 hours in the life of an imaginary urban centre, created from composite images from major Canadian cities. The film was created from over 3,000 animated photos, projected onto a large screen with a 150-degree curve.

Production
Glimpses/Impressions was based on a proposal from the Cirque du Soleil, who were contracted by the Department of Canadian Heritage to design the pavilion's exhibitions. It is produced by the National Film Board of Canada.

To create the images for the film, photographers Serge Clément and Claude-Simon Langlois travelled across Canada to take more than 57,000 photographs.

Composer Normand Roger and collaborators Pierre Yves Drapeau and Yves Chartrand scored the film, adapting Mario Leblanc's "Androgyne." The Leblanc composition had been used to inspire the creative team, before ultimately being chosen for the soundtrack.

References

External links
Watch Glimpses/Impressions at NFB.ca 
Watch Glimpses - En Route For Shanghai at NFB.ca 

2010 animated films
2010 films
National Film Board of Canada animated short films
Expo 2010
World's fair films
Films without speech
Cirque du Soleil
Documentary films about cities
Canadian short documentary films
Films directed by Jean-François Pouliot
Films scored by Normand Roger
2010 short films
Canadian animated short films
2010s Canadian films
2010 short documentary films
Canadian animated documentary films